Monascaceae is a family of fungi in the subclass Eurotiomycetidae.

Genera
According to Mycobank, Monascaceae is currently subdivided as follows:

 Allescheria
 Backusia
 Basipetospora
 Eurotiella
 Fraseriella
 Monascus
 Physomyces
 Xeromyces

References

Eurotiomycetes
Ascomycota families